The China–Korea New Pro Wang is a Go competition sponsored by BC Card.

Outline
The China–Korea New Pro Wang is a tournament where players under the age of 25 from China and Korea compete.

Past winners

International Go competitions